Pantothenate kinase 2, mitochondrial is an enzyme that in humans is encoded by the PANK2 gene.

This gene encodes a protein belonging to the pantothenate kinase family and is the only member of that family to be expressed in mitochondria. Pantothenate kinase is a key regulatory enzyme in the biosynthesis of coenzyme A (CoA) in bacteria and mammalian cells. It catalyzes the first committed step in the universal biosynthetic pathway leading to CoA and is itself subject to regulation through feedback inhibition by acyl CoA species. Mutations in this gene are associated with HARP syndrome and Pantothenate kinase-associated neurodegeneration (PKAN). Alternative splicing, involving the use of alternate first exons, results in multiple transcripts encoding different isoforms.

References

Further reading

External links
  GeneReviews/NCBI/NIH/UW entry on Pantothenate Kinase-Associated Neurodegeneration